The 2013 Formula Renault 1.6 Nordic season was the inaugural season of the Formula Renault 1.6 Nordic, a series running 1600cc Formula Renault machinery in similar fashion to the French F4 Championship. The series began on 3 May at Ring Knutstorp and ended on 21 September at Mantorp Park, after fifteen races held in seven venues. Most of these rounds were held in support of the 2013 Scandinavian Touring Car Championship season, joint organiser of the series along with the FIA Northern European Zone Organisation.

The series uses all-carbon Signatech chassis, 1.6-litre 140bhp Renault K4MRS engines, and Dunlop tyres.

Drivers and teams

Race calendar and results
Except for the second round in Estonia, all rounds took place in Sweden. All Swedish rounds, except for the one in the Kinnekulle Ring, were held in support of the STCC championship.

Rounds denoted with a blue background were a part of the Formula Renault 1.6 NEZ Championship.

Championship standings
Points system
Points were awarded to the top 10 classified finishers. No points were awarded for pole or fastest lap.

Parallel to the main championship, two other championships were held: the Formula Renault 1.6 Junior Svenskt Mästerskap (JSM) for drivers under 26 years old holding a Swedish driver license, and the Formula Renault 1.6 Northern European Zone (NEZ) championship at selected rounds. Points to these championships were awarded using the same system.

Formula Renault 1.6 Nordic Championship

Formula Renault 1.6 JSM Championship

Formula Renault 1.6 NEZ Championship

References

External links
 Official website of the category at Renault Sport Sverige 
 Official website of the category at STCC

Nordic
Formula Renault
Renault 1.6 Nordic
Motorsport competitions in Sweden